Top 10 Student is a South Korean television program which aired on KBS2 on Monday at 20:30 (KST) from October 2, 2020.

Format 
Top 10 Student is a competitive program that reinterprets the once-popular show, Top 10 Songs, into the emotions of teenagers and showcases performances.

Broadcast time

Cast 
 MC
 Lee Juck
 Kim Hee-chul
 Fixed Panel
 Lee Sang-min
 Tony Ahn
 Kim Hyeong-seok
 Eunhyuk (Super Junior)
 Park Moon-chi

List of episodes and rating  

See also

References

External links 
 
 

2020 South Korean television series debuts
2020 South Korean television series endings
Korean-language television shows